The 2021 Desert X-Prix was an Extreme E off-road race that was held on 3 and 4 April 2021 in Al-'Ula, Saudi Arabia. It was the first Championship round of the electric off-road racing car series' inaugural season. The final was won by Johan Kristoffersson and Molly Taylor for the Rosberg X Racing team, ahead of Andretti United Extreme E and Team X44.

Classification

Qualifying

Semi-final

Crazy Race

Shootout

Notes:
  – Retired after crashing on lap 2.
  – Chip Ganassi Racing and Kyle LeDuc received a 1 championship point penalty for causing a collision.

Final

References

External links
 

|- style="text-align:center"
|width="35%"|Previous race:N/A
|width="30%"|Extreme E Championship2021 season
|width="35%"|Next race:2021 Ocean X-Prix
|- style="text-align:center"
|width="35%"|Previous race:N/A
|width="30%"|Desert X-Prix
|width="35%"|Next race:2022 Desert X-Prix
|- style="text-align:center"

Desert X-Prix
Desert X-Prix
Desert X-Prix